Sonoluminescence is the emission  of light from imploding bubbles in a liquid when excited by sound.

History
The sonoluminescence effect was first discovered at the University of Cologne in 1934 as a result of work on sonar. Hermann Frenzel and H. Schultes put an ultrasound transducer in a tank of photographic developer fluid. They hoped to speed up the development process. Instead, they noticed tiny dots on the film after developing and realized that the bubbles in the fluid were emitting light with the ultrasound turned on. It was too difficult to analyze the effect in early experiments because of the complex environment of a large number of short-lived bubbles. This phenomenon is now referred to as multi-bubble sonoluminescence (MBSL).

In 1960, Peter Jarman from Imperial College of London proposed the most reliable theory of sonoluminescence phenomenon. He concluded that sonoluminescence is basically thermal in origin and that it might possibly arise from microshocks with the collapsing cavities.

In 1989, an experimental advance was introduced which produced stable single-bubble sonoluminescence (SBSL). In single-bubble sonoluminescence, a single bubble trapped in an acoustic standing wave emits a pulse of light with each compression of the bubble within the standing wave. This technique allowed a more systematic study of the phenomenon, because it isolated the complex effects into one stable, predictable bubble. It was realized that the temperature inside the bubble was hot enough to melt steel, as seen in an experiment done in 2012; the temperature inside the bubble as it collapsed reached about 12,000 kelvins. Interest in sonoluminescence was renewed when an inner temperature of such a bubble well above one million kelvins was postulated.

Properties

Sonoluminescence can occur when a sound wave of sufficient intensity induces a gaseous cavity within a liquid to collapse quickly. This cavity may take the form of a pre-existing bubble, or may be generated through a process known as cavitation. Sonoluminescence in the laboratory can be made to be stable, so that a single bubble will expand and collapse over and over again in a periodic fashion, emitting a burst of light each time it collapses. For this to occur, a standing acoustic wave is set up within a liquid, and the bubble will sit at a pressure anti-node of the standing wave. The frequencies of resonance depend on the shape and size of the container in which the bubble is contained.

Some facts about sonoluminescence: 
 The light that flashes from the bubbles last between 35 and a few hundred picoseconds long, with peak intensities of the order of 1–.
 The bubbles are very small when they emit light—about 1 micrometer in diameter—depending on the ambient fluid (e.g., water) and the gas content of the bubble (e.g., atmospheric air).
 Single-bubble sonoluminescence pulses can have very stable periods and positions. In fact, the frequency of light flashes can be more stable than the rated frequency stability of the oscillator making the sound waves driving them. However, the stability analyses of the bubble show that the bubble itself undergoes significant geometric instabilities, due to, for example, the Bjerknes forces and Rayleigh–Taylor instabilities.
 The addition of a small amount of noble gas (such as helium, argon, or xenon) to the gas in the bubble increases the intensity of the emitted light.

Detection of very high bubble temperatures by spectral methods is limited due to the opacity of liquids to short wavelength light characteristic of very high temperatures.

A study describes a method of determining temperatures based on the formation of plasmas. Using argon bubbles in sulfuric acid, the data shows the presence of ionized molecular oxygen O2+, sulfur monoxide, and atomic argon populating high-energy excited states, which confirms a hypothesis that the bubbles have a hot plasma core. The ionization and excitation energy of dioxygenyl cations, which they observed, is 18 electronvolts. From this they conclude the core temperatures reach at least 20,000 kelvins—hotter than the surface of the sun.

Rayleigh–Plesset equation

The dynamics of the motion of the bubble is characterized to a first approximation by the Rayleigh–Plesset equation (named after Lord Rayleigh and Milton Plesset):

This is an approximate equation that is derived from the Navier–Stokes equations (written in spherical coordinate system) and describes the motion of the radius of the bubble R as a function of time t. Here, μ is the viscosity,  is the external pressure infinitely far from the bubble,  is the internal pressure of the bubble,  is the liquid density, and γ is the surface tension. The over-dots represent time derivatives. This equation, though approximate, has been shown to give good estimates on the motion of the bubble under the acoustically driven field except during the final stages of collapse. Both simulation and experimental measurement show that during the critical final stages of collapse, the bubble wall velocity exceeds the speed of sound of the gas inside the bubble. Thus a more detailed analysis of the bubble's motion is needed beyond Rayleigh–Plesset to explore the additional energy focusing that an internally formed shock wave might produce. In the static case, the Rayleigh-Plesset equation simplifies, yielding the Young-Laplace equation.

Mechanism of phenomenon

The mechanism of the phenomenon of sonoluminescence is unknown. Hypotheses include: hotspot, bremsstrahlung radiation, collision-induced radiation and corona discharges, nonclassical light, proton tunneling, electrodynamic jets and fractoluminescent jets (now largely discredited due to contrary experimental evidence).

In 2002, M. Brenner, S. Hilgenfeldt, and D. Lohse published a 60-page review that contains a detailed explanation of the mechanism. An important factor is that the bubble contains mainly inert noble gas such as argon or xenon (air contains about 1% argon, and the amount dissolved in water is too great; for sonoluminescence to occur, the concentration must be reduced to 20–40% of its equilibrium value) and varying amounts of water vapor. Chemical reactions cause nitrogen and oxygen to be removed from the bubble after about one hundred expansion-collapse cycles. The bubble will then begin to emit light. The light emission of highly compressed noble gas is exploited technologically in the argon flash devices.

During bubble collapse, the inertia of the surrounding water causes high pressure and high temperature, reaching around 10,000 kelvins in the interior of the bubble, causing the ionization of a small fraction of the noble gas present. The amount ionized is small enough for the bubble to remain transparent, allowing volume emission; surface emission would produce more intense light of longer duration, dependent on wavelength, contradicting experimental results. Electrons from ionized atoms interact mainly with neutral atoms, causing thermal bremsstrahlung radiation. As the wave hits a low energy trough, the pressure drops, allowing electrons to recombine with atoms and light emission to cease due to this lack of free electrons. This makes for a 160-picosecond light pulse for argon (even a small drop in temperature causes a large drop in ionization, due to the large ionization energy relative to photon energy). This description is simplified from the literature above, which details various steps of differing duration from 15 microseconds (expansion) to 100 picoseconds (emission).

Computations based on the theory presented in the review produce radiation parameters (intensity and duration time versus wavelength) that match experimental results with errors no larger than expected due to some simplifications (e.g., assuming a uniform temperature in the entire bubble), so it seems the phenomenon of sonoluminescence is at least roughly explained, although some details of the process remain obscure.

Any discussion of sonoluminescence must include a detailed analysis of metastability. Sonoluminescence in this respect is what is physically termed a bounded phenomenon meaning that the sonoluminescence exists in a bounded region of parameter space for the bubble; a coupled magnetic field being one such parameter. The magnetic aspects of sonoluminescence are very well documented.

Other proposals

Quantum explanations
An unusually exotic hypothesis of sonoluminescence, which has received much popular attention, is the Casimir energy hypothesis suggested by noted physicist Julian Schwinger and more thoroughly considered in a paper by Claudia Eberlein of the University of Sussex. Eberlein's paper suggests that the light in sonoluminescence is generated by the vacuum within the bubble in a process similar to Hawking radiation, the radiation generated at the event horizon of black holes. According to this vacuum energy explanation, since quantum theory holds that vacuum contains virtual particles, the rapidly moving interface between water and gas converts virtual photons into real photons. This is related to the Unruh effect or the Casimir effect. The argument has been made that sonoluminescence releases too large an amount of energy and releases the energy on too short a time scale to be consistent with the vacuum energy explanation, although other credible sources argue the vacuum energy explanation might yet prove to be correct.

Nuclear reactions

Some have argued that the Rayleigh–Plesset equation described above is unreliable for predicting bubble temperatures and that actual temperatures in sonoluminescing systems can be far higher than 20,000 kelvins. Some research claims to have measured temperatures as high as 100,000 kelvins, and speculates temperatures could reach into the millions of kelvins. Temperatures this high could cause thermonuclear fusion. This possibility is sometimes referred to as bubble fusion and is likened to the implosion design used in the fusion component of thermonuclear weapons.

Experiments in 2002 and 2005 by R. P. Taleyarkhan using deuterated acetone showed measurements of tritium and neutron output consistent with fusion. However, the papers were considered low quality and there were doubts cast by a report about the author's scientific misconduct. This made the report lose credibility among the scientific community.

On January 27, 2006, researchers at Rensselaer Polytechnic Institute claimed to have produced fusion in sonoluminescence experiments.

Biological sonoluminescence

Pistol shrimp (also called snapping shrimp) produce a type of cavitation luminescence from a collapsing bubble caused by quickly snapping its claw. The animal snaps a specialized claw shut to create a cavitation bubble that generates acoustic pressures of up to 80 kPa at a distance of 4 cm from the claw. As it extends out from the claw, the bubble reaches speeds of 60 miles per hour (97 km/h) and releases a sound reaching 218 decibels. The pressure is strong enough to kill small fish. The light produced is of lower intensity than the light produced by typical sonoluminescence and is not visible to the naked eye. The light and heat produced by the bubble may have no direct significance, as it is the shockwave produced by the rapidly collapsing bubble which these shrimp use to stun or kill prey. However, it is the first known instance of an animal producing light by this effect and was whimsically dubbed "shrimpoluminescence" upon its discovery in 2001. It has subsequently been discovered that another group of crustaceans, the mantis shrimp, contains species whose club-like forelimbs can strike so quickly and with such force as to induce sonoluminescent cavitation bubbles upon impact.
A mechanical device with 3D printed snapper claw at five times the actual size was also reported to emit light in a similar fashion, this bioinspired design was based on the snapping shrimp snapper claw molt shed from an Alpheus formosus, the striped snapping shrimp.

See also 
 List of light sources
 Triboluminescence
 Sonochemistry
 Acoustic wave
 Seth Putterman

References

Further reading 

 
 
 
 
 
 
 For a "How to" guide for student science projects see: 
  This article was created in 1996 together with the alternative theory; both were seen by Ms Eberlein. It contains many references to the crucial experimental results in this field.

External links 

 Detailed description of a sonoluminescence experiment
 A description of the effect and experiment, with a diagram of the apparatus
 An mpg video of the collapsing bubble (934 kB)
 Shrimpoluminescence 
 Impulse Devices
 Applications of sonochemistry
 Sound waves size up sonoluminescence 
 Sonoluminescence: Sound into light

Luminescence
Ultrasound
Light sources
Physical phenomena
Unsolved problems in physics
Articles containing video clips
1934 in science
Bubbles (physics)
Acoustics